NARP may refer to:
 The genetic disorder Neuropathy, ataxia, and retinitis pigmentosa
 The National Association of Railroad Passengers
 Nikolaev Aircraft Repair Plant - a Russian aircraft repair design and manufacture company
 Non-Athletic Regular Person (acronym)

Narp or narp may refer to:
 Narp, a commune in France
 Narp, Iran, a village in Iran
Narp, an obscure term for a musical tone between natural and sharp (a half sharp)